Barb Wire was a soundtrack for the film of the same name, released in 1996. It contains 11 tracks of rock music including covers of songs by Patti Smith and Cameo.

Track listing 
 Tommy Lee - "Planet Boom" (Tommy Lee) - 3:58
 Johnette Napolitano - "She's So Free" (Johnette Napolitano) - 2:54
 Michael Hutchence - "Spill the Wine" (Sylvester Allen/Harold Brown/B.B. Dickerson/Lonnie Jordan/Charles Miller/Lee Oskar/Howard Scott) - 5:51
 Gun - "Word Up!"  (Larry Blackmon/Tomi Jenkins) - 4:17
 Shampoo - "Don't Call Me Babe" (Con Fitzgerald/Carrie Askew/Jacqueline Blake) - 2:58
 Hagfish - "Hot Child in the City" (Nick Gilder/Jimmy McCulloch) - 2:34
 Marion - "Let's All Go Together" (Phil Cunningham/A.P. Grantham/Jaime Harding) - 3:09
  Die Cheerleader - "Dancing Barefoot" (Ivan Kral/Patti Smith) - 3:50
 Meat Puppets in Vapourspace - "Scum" (Curt Kirkwood) - 5:38
  Mr. Ed Jumps the Gun - "Ca Plane Pour Moi" (Lou Deprijck/Yves M. Lacomblez) - 2:33
 Salt-N-Pepa - "None of Your Business (Barb Wire Metal Mix)" (Hurby "Luv Bug" Azor) - 3:33

References

1996 soundtrack albums
1990s film soundtrack albums
Island Records soundtracks
Science fiction film soundtracks
Action film soundtracks